The Simcoe Muskoka Catholic District School Board (SMCDSB, known as English-language Separate District School Board No. 44 prior to 1999) administers and governs separate school Catholic education from kindergarten through grade 12 in Simcoe County and the District of Muskoka, in Ontario, Canada. As of 2018-2019, the school board has 41 elementary and 9 secondary schools located in communities throughout Simcoe County and the District of Muskoka. Its boundaries are Highway 9 in the south to Huntsville in the north, and from Collingwood in the west to Brechin on the east side of Lake Simcoe.

The board was originally known as Simcoe Muskoka Roman Catholic Separate School Board (SMRCSSB) and operated anglophone and francophone schools.

Secondary schools
The following is a list of the secondary schools managed by the SMCDSB:

Elementary schools
The following is a list of the elementary schools managed by the SMCDSB:

See also
Archdiocese of Toronto
Simcoe County District School Board
Trillium Lakelands District School Board
List of school districts in Ontario
List of high schools in Ontario

References

External links
Simcoe Muskoka Catholic District School Board

Education in the District Municipality of Muskoka
Education in Simcoe County
Roman Catholic school districts in Ontario
Non-profit organizations based in Barrie
Roman Catholic Archdiocese of Toronto